Yevgeny Vasilyevich Frolov (born 14 June 1941) is a retired Russian amateur boxer. He competed at the 1964 and 1968 Olympics in the light welterweight division and finished in second and fifth place, respectively. Frolov was left handed and his favorite strike was left jab. He retired with a record of 197 wins out of 212. He graduated from the Moscow State Forest University and then the All-Russian Academy of Foreign Trade and later worked at the Ministry of Foreign Trade.

1964 Olympic results
Below is the record of Yevgeny Frolov, a light welterweight boxer from the Soviet Union who competed at the 1964 Tokyo Olympics:

 Round of 64: bye
 Round of 32: defeated Brian Maunsell (New Zealand) referee stopped contest
 Round of 16: defeated Charley Ellis (United States) by decision, 3-2
 Quarterfinal: defeated Vladimir Kucera (Czechoslovakia) by walkover
 Semifinal: defeated Habib Galhia (Tunisia) by decision, 5-0
 Final: lost to Jerzy Kulej (Poland) by decision, 0-5 (was awarded silver medal)

References

1941 births
Russian male boxers
Soviet male boxers
Boxers at the 1964 Summer Olympics
Boxers at the 1968 Summer Olympics
Olympic boxers of the Soviet Union
Medalists at the 1964 Summer Olympics
Olympic medalists in boxing
Olympic silver medalists for the Soviet Union
Moscow State Forest University alumni
Martial artists from Moscow
Living people
Light-welterweight boxers